Chichester House or Carew's House was a building in College Green (formerly Hoggen Green), Dublin, Ireland, used in the 17th century to house the Parliament of Ireland.  Originally built to be a hospital, it was never used as such.

At one time, the building had been owned by Sir George Carew, President of Munster and Lord High Treasurer of Ireland. The house itself was built on the site of a nunnery dissolved by King Henry VIII. Carew's House was later purchased by Sir Arthur Chichester and renamed Chichester House. It was used as a temporary home of the Kingdom of Ireland's law courts during the Michaelmas law term in 1605. Documents facilitating the Plantation of Ulster were signed in the house on 16 November 1612.  Some sources state that the house was built by Chichester in the early 17th century.

In 1673 it was assigned as the home of the parliament by Charles II. From its opening it was in a bad state of repair and was replaced following the groundbreaking for the new Parliament House, designed by Sir Edward Lovett Pearce, in 1729.

References

Houses in the Republic of Ireland
Government buildings in the Republic of Ireland
Buildings and structures in Dublin (city)